Royal Air Force Fraserburgh, or more simply RAF Fraserburgh, is a former Royal Air Force station located in Aberdeenshire, Scotland,  south east of Fraserburgh and  north west of Peterhead.

History

The following units were based at Fraserburgh at some point:

 No. 8 Operational Training Unit RAF (May 1942 – February 1943)
 Relief Landing Ground of No. 14 (Pilots) Advanced Flying Unit (May 1943 – September 1944)
 No. 279 Squadron RAF
 No. 281 Squadron RAF
 823 Naval Air Squadron
 838 Naval Air Squadron
 883 Naval Air Squadron
 No. 2792 Squadron RAF Regiment
 No. 2807 Squadron RAF Regiment
 No. 2848 Squadron RAF Regiment

Cairnbulg Castle was used as the Officers' Mess. The domestic sites were situated either side of the B9033 road, between the Castle and the airfield, and known as Inverallochy RAF Camp and Tershinty RAF Camp.

Current use
The north and north western sides have been taken over by housing, and the rest of the site is used for farming.

See also
 List of former Royal Air Force stations

References

Citations

Bibliography

Royal Air Force stations in Scotland
Defunct airports in Scotland
Buildings and structures in Aberdeenshire
Airports established in 1940
Buildings and structures in Fraserburgh
1940 establishments in Scotland
1945 disestablishments in Scotland